Friedensville is an unincorporated community which is located in Upper Saucon Township in Lehigh County, Pennsylvania. It is part of the Lehigh Valley, which had a population of 861,899 and was the 68th most populous metropolitan area in the U.S. as of the 2020 census.

Zinc mining was once a key industry in the area.

Zinc mines
Friedensville Zinc Mines were an important operation in this community, dating back to 1845. Jacob Ueberroth (1786–1862), a local farmer, first discovered the zinc mineral, . 

In 1881, Franklin Osgood purchased the Lehigh Zinc Company’s mines and formed the Friedensville Zinc Company. He built a zinc oxide plant and zinc smelter in Friedensville.

References

Unincorporated communities in Lehigh County, Pennsylvania
Unincorporated communities in Pennsylvania